Melodifestivalen 2017 was the 57th edition of the Swedish music competition Melodifestivalen, which selected Sweden's entry for the Eurovision Song Contest 2017. The competition was organised by Sveriges Television (SVT) and took place over a six-week period between 4 February and 11 March 2017.

The format of the competition consisted of 6 shows: 4 heat rounds, a second chance round and a final. An initial 28 entries were selected for the competition through three methods: an open call for song submissions, direct invitations to specific artists and songwriters and a wildcard given to one of the artists that participated in the Svensktoppen nästa competition organised by Sveriges Radio P4. The 28 competing entries were divided into four heats, with seven compositions in each. From each heat, the songs that earn first and second place qualified directly to the final, while the songs that place third and fourth proceeded to the Second Chance round. The bottom three songs in each heat were eliminated from the competition. An additional four entries qualified from the Second Chance round to the final, bringing the total number of competing entries in the final to 12. All 6 shows were hosted by Clara Henry, David Lindgren and Hasse Andersson.

The winning song would compete for Sweden at the Eurovision Song Contest 2017 to be held in Kyiv, Ukraine. Sweden competed in the first semi-final of the Eurovision Song Contest 2017 on 9 May and had to place within the top 10 out of the 18 in their semi-final in order to qualify and compete in the final on 13 May.

Format 
Melodifestivalen 2017, organised by Sveriges Television (SVT), was the sixteenth consecutive edition of the contest in which the competition took place in different cities across Sweden. The four heats were held at the Scandinavium in Gothenburg (4 February), the Malmö Arena in Malmö (11 February), the Vida Arena in Växjö (18 February) and the Skellefteå Kraft Arena in Skellefteå (25 February). The Second Chance round took place at the Saab Arena in Linköping on 4 March while the final was held at the Friends Arena in Solna on 11 March. An initial 28 entries competed in the heats, with seven entries taking part in each show. The top two entries from each heat advanced directly to the final, while the third and fourth placed entries advanced to the Second Chance round. The bottom three entries in each heat were eliminated. An additional four entries qualified for the final from the Second Chance round, bringing the total number of competing entries in the final to 12.

Christer Björkman was announced as the executive producer of the competition, while Annette Helenius was assigned as the project manager for a second consecutive year.

Entry selection 
Entries for the 2017 competition were selected through three methods:
14 entries were chosen by a selection panel from submissions received by SVT through an open call for songs.
13 entries were selected by SVT via special invitations to artists and songwriters.
1 entry was provided by the selected artist from the competition Svensktoppen nästa organised by Sveriges Radio P4.

SVT opened two submission contests that accepted entries between 1 and 19 September 2016 for interested artists and songwriters to submit their proposals for the competition. The Regular contest was open for entries that had at least one songwriter that already had a musical work published, while the Public contest accepted entries from songwriters without previously published musical work. Entries submitted for the competition were required to be new compositions which had never been published, between 2–3 minutes in length and with at least one songwriter that holds Swedish citizenship. The choice of language was free, however, SVT aims to have 30% of the contest's places reserved for entries sung mainly in Swedish. SVT also aims to reserve at least 50% of the contest's places for entries written by female composers and lyricists either in a solo or collaborative capacity.

Following the conclusion of the submission periods, SVT received 2,478 entries—an increase of 28 entries from the previous year. 2,116 of the entries were entered into the Regular contest, while 362 entries were entered into the Public contest. SVT created a shortlist of entries from the received submissions and formed a selection panel that was tasked to select fourteen entries for the competition. Only five entries from the Public contest were under consideration with no guarantee that one would be selected to compete in Melodifestivalen.

Presenters 

At a press conference on 30 September 2016, Clara Henry, David Lindgren and Hasse Andersson were announced as the hosts for all six shows of Melodifestivalen 2017. Henry previously appeared in comedic skits and hosted pre and post shows during Melodifestivalen 2014. Lindgren and Andersson previously competed as artists in the competition; Lindgren took part in 2012, 2013 and 2016, while Andersson took part in 2015.

Competing entries 
Information regarding the selected entries and artists were publicised by SVT on 30 November 2016. On 28 August 2016, Les Gordons were selected as the first artists for Melodifestivalen from the competing artists that took part in the Svensktoppen nästa competition organised by Sveriges Radio P4.

Heats 
As in previous years, Melodifestivalen will commence with four heats, which will determine the eight entries that will advance directly to the final and the eight entries that will qualify to the Second Chance round.

Heat 1 
The first heat took place on 4 February 2017 at the Scandinavium arena in Gothenburg. A total of 5,706,113 votes were cast throughout the show.

Heat 2 
The second heat took place on 11 February 2017 at Malmö Arena in Malmö. A total of 5,395,695 votes were cast throughout the show.

Heat 3 
The third heat took place on 18 February 2017 at Vida Arena in Växjö. A total of 5,756,071 votes were cast throughout the show.

Heat 4 
The fourth heat took place on 25 February 2017 at Skellefteå Kraft Arena in Skellefteå. A total of 4,951,648 votes were cast throughout the show.

Second Chance round 
Second Chance round took place on 4 March 2017 at Cloetta Center in Linköping. The duels were revealed following the fourth heat on 25 February 2017. A total of 7,223,709 votes were cast throughout the show.

Final 
The Final took place on 11 March 2017 at Friends Arena in Stockholm. A record-breaking total of 13,566,778 votes were cast. Zara Larsson performed a medley of her singles I Would Like and Ain't My Fault during the interval act, whilst Melodifestivalen 2016 winner Frans performed his winning entry If I Were Sorry before the announcement of the International Jury votes.

Broadcast and ratings
All six shows in the competition were televised live on SVT1 and SVT World as well as streamed online via the broadcaster's streaming service SVT Play. The shows were also broadcast via radio on Sveriges Radio P4.

References

External links 
 Melodifestivalen Official Site

2017 in Swedish music
Eurovision
2017 song contests
February 2017 events in Europe
Eurovision Song Contest 2017
March 2017 events in Europe
2017
2010s in Malmö
2010s in Gothenburg
Events in Gothenburg
Events at Malmö Arena
Events in Skellefteå
Events in Växjö
Events in Linköping
Events in Solna